Dame Anita Lucia Roddick  (23 October 1942 – 10 September 2007) was a British businesswoman, human rights activist and environmental campaigner, best known as the founder of The Body Shop, now The Body Shop International Limited, a cosmetics company producing and retailing natural beauty products which shaped ethical consumerism. The company was one of the first to prohibit the use of ingredients tested on animals in some of its products and one of the first to promote fair trade with developing countries.

Roddick was involved in activism and campaigning for environmental and social issues, including involvement with Greenpeace and The Big Issue. In 1990, Roddick founded Children on the Edge, a charitable organisation which helps disadvantaged children in Eastern Europe, Africa and Asia. She believed that business should offer a form of moral leadership, being a more powerful force in society than religion or government.

In the late 1990s, she became involved in advocating for the Angola Three, African-American prisoners at the Louisiana State Penitentiary who had already been held in solitary confinement for decades. She helped raise international awareness and funds to aid in their appeals of flawed trials.

The Body Shop

Roddick opened the first Body Shop in 1976, with the goal of earning an income for herself and her two daughters while her husband was away in South America. She wanted to provide quality skincare products in refillable containers and sample sizes, all marketed with truth rather than hype. She opened her second shop six months later. On her husband's return, he joined the business.

By 1991, the Body Shop had 700 branches, and Roddick was awarded the 1991 World Vision Award for Development Initiative. In 1996 she told Third Way:

In 1997, Roddick developed the Body Shop's most successful campaign ever, creating Ruby, the size 16 doll, who was thought to bear a passing resemblance to Barbie. The campaign evolved from positioning developed by ethical communications consultancy Host Universal. They created the image of the naked red-haired doll, hands behind her head and wind in her hair, that became the embodiment of the campaign. The photographer was Steve Perry.

By 2004, the Body Shop had 1980 stores, serving more than 77 million customers throughout the world. It was voted the second most-trusted brand in the United Kingdom, and 28th top brand in the world.

On 17 March 2006, L'Oréal purchased Body Shop for £652 million. Some controversy and criticism was raised, as L'Oréal was known to use animal testing and the company was part-owned by Nestlé. The latter had been criticised for its treatment of third-world producers. Roddick addressed the issues directly in an interview with The Guardian. It reported that 
"she sees herself as a kind of 'Trojan horse' who by selling her business to a huge firm will be able to influence the decisions it makes. Suppliers who had formerly worked with the Body Shop will in future have contracts with L'Oréal, and whilst working with the company 25 days a year Roddick was able to have an input into decisions."

Charity work

Roddick was known for her campaigning work on environmental issues and was a member of the Demos think tank's advisory council.

In 1990 Roddick founded Children on the Edge (COTE), in response to her visits to Romanian orphanages. She created COTE to help manage the crisis of poor conditions in the overcrowded orphanages and worked to de-institutionalise the children over the course of their early life. COTE's mission is to help disadvantaged children affected by conflicts, natural disasters, disabilities, and HIV/AIDS.

In the late 1990s, Roddick became involved in the case of the Angola Three, African-American men who had been held for more than two decades in solitary confinement at Louisiana State Penitentiary. She helped raise international awareness of their case and funds to support appeals of their flawed convictions.

On 13 December 2005, the National Post reported that Roddick had announced that she intended to use her fortune for philanthropy; it was estimated at £51 million ($104 million). This was before her sale of her business to L'Oreal.

Roddick wrote the book Take It Personally. She encouraged equality and an end to the exploitation of workers and children in underdeveloped countries.

After her death in 2007, her husband, Gordon Roddick, founded 38 Degrees in her memory. He said, "I knew what would make Anita really laugh would be to cause a lot of trouble."

Between 2009 and 2014, the Roddick Foundation gave four grants totalling £120,000 to CAGE, an organisation led by Mozzam Begg, that aimed "to raise awareness of the plight of the prisoners at Guantánamo Bay and other detainees held as part of the War on Terror". The Foundation, along with two other charities, agreed to cease funding CAGE under pressure from the Charity Commission, which had expressed concern that funding CAGE risked damaging public confidence in charity. Lord Carlile, formerly the British Government's independent reviewer of anti-terrorism legislation, said: "I would never advise anybody to give money to CagePrisoners. I have concerns about the group".

In 2015, the charity commission agreed to cease to interfere with charities' right to fund CAGE, if they wished, following a judicial review. The judicial review heard testimony that a British Cabinet Minister and US intelligence had applied pressure on the charity commission to investigate CAGE.

Roddick was a close friend of Littlehampton Community School. In 2003, it successfully applied to become a Business and Enterprise specialist school. Much of the money required was donated by Roddick. As a result of this donation, a new building built with this money was named The Roddick Enterprise Centre (normally abbreviated to 'REC'). The Littlehampton College also hosts 'Roddick Days' such as 'Day of Action' and 'One World'; these events allow students to give something back to their local community and learn about what is happening around them.

Illness
In 2004, Roddick was diagnosed with liver cirrhosis due to long-standing hepatitis C. She did not reveal her illness until 14 February 2007. Roddick said, "I have hepatitis C. It's a bit of a bummer, but you groan and move on". She subsequently promoted the work of The Hepatitis C Trust, and campaigned to increase awareness of the disease. On 30 August 2007, less than two weeks before her death, Roddick was a special guest in an episode of the live television programme Doctor, Doctor broadcast on Channel 5 in the UK. She discussed hepatitis C with the presenter and general practitioner, Mark Porter.

Roddick explained that her hepatitis C was unexpectedly diagnosed in 2004, following a blood test that was part of a medical examination needed for a life insurance policy. The blood test indicated abnormal liver function and subsequent blood tests diagnosed hepatitis C. Roddick explained that she had a large blood transfusion in 1971, after the birth of her younger daughter, and that she was convinced that the transfusion had infected her with hepatitis C. This was about twenty years before blood donors in the United Kingdom were screened for hepatitis C.

She reported that she had developed cirrhosis of the liver, and that her main symptoms were itching and poor concentration. She briefly mentioned that medical treatment with interferon did not suit her. Roddick explained that she kept fit and active, and that she attended biannual out-patient hospital appointments in Southampton, as well as being under review by the liver transplant team at the Addenbrooke's Hospital in Cambridge.

Death and legacy
Roddick died of acute brain haemorrhage at about 6:30pm on 10 September 2007, after being admitted to St Richard's Hospital, Chichester the previous evening suffering from a severe headache. As promised earlier, she left her estate to charities rather than to her family and friends. When details of her estate were published, it was disclosed that she had donated all of her £51 million fortune upon her death.

Controversies
In a May 2002 article in The Globe and Mail, Jon Entine reported that Roddick had copied the name, concept and original brochures from the original Body Shop, which was started in Berkeley, California in 1970 and had three stores when Roddick visited the Bay Area in the early 1970s. Roddick's original brochures were verbatim copies of material produced by the Berkeley-based Body Shop. When Roddick decided to expand her multinational corporation into the United States, she bought the rights to the Body Shop name for $3.5 million from the original shop owners. They were required to sign a confidentiality agreement at the time. The US Body Shop renamed itself Body Time, and remained in operation until April 2018.

Entine also noted that Roddick's Body Shop did not make charitable donations for its first 11 years of operation, although Roddick had made statements to the contrary. The Body Shop opened in Brighton in March 1976. The company entered the stock exchange in 1984. The first sponsorship, which was made possible by the wealth generated by the IPO, was for Greenpeace posters in 1985.

Awards and honours
1984 – Veuve Clicquot Businesses Woman of the Year
1988 – Officer of the Order of the British Empire (OBE)
1988 – Honorary Doctorate from the University of Sussex
1991 – Center for World Development Education's World Vision Award, USA
1993 – Banksia Foundation's Australia Environmental Award
1993 – Mexican Environmental Achiever Award
1993 – National Audubon Society Medal, USA
1994 – Botwinick Prize in Business Ethics, USA
1994 – University of Michigan's Annual Business Leadership Award, USA
1995 - University of Victoria, Honorary Doctorate, Canada
1995 – Women's Business Development Center's First Annual Woman Power Award, USA
1996 – Women's Center's Leadership Award, USA
1996 – The Gleitsman Foundation's Award of Achievement, USA
1997 – United Nations Environment Programme (UNEP), Honouree, Eyes on the Environment
1999 – Honorary Degree (Doctor of Laws) from the University of Bath
1999 – British Environment & Media Award
1999 – Chief Wiper-Away of Ogoni Tears, Movement for the Survival of the Ogoni People, Nigeria
2001 – International Peace Prayer Day Organisation's Woman of Peace
2003 – Dame Commander of the Order of the British Empire (DBE)
2004 – Honorary Doctorate of Public Service, The Sage Colleges
2005 – Shell liveWIRE survey of inspirational role models, third place after 1) Richard Branson 2) Friends/family 3) Anita Roddick 4) James Dyson 5) Sahar Hashemi
2006 – Spirit of the Rainforest Award, Rainforest Action Network

Bibliography
Roddick wrote and published several books related to her business:
 The Body Shop Book – Macdonald, 1985
 Mamatoto: the Body Shop Celebration of Birth – Virago, 1991
 (with Russell Miller) – Body and Soul – Ebury Press, 1991
 Take it personally: How Globalisation Affects You and Powerful Ways to Challenge It – Anita Roddick Books, 2004
 Troubled Water: Saints, Sinners, Truth and Lies about the Global Water Crisis – Anita Roddick Books, 2004 (with Brooke Shelby Biggs)
 Business as Unusual – Anita Roddick Books, 2005 (Latest edition)

References

Further readingLife and Times. Vanessa Phelps interviews Anita Roddick. BBC television. First broadcast 2000.Doctor, Doctor''. Dr Mark Porter interviews Anita Roddick. Five TV. Broadcast live, 30 August 2007.

External links
 AnitaRoddick.com (Roddick's website and blog)
College Students Pay Tribute at the Anita Roddick Memorial Service – from the Littlehampton College Website

1942 births
2007 deaths
Alumni of Bath Spa University
British cosmetics businesspeople
Dames Commander of the Order of the British Empire
English feminists
English people of Italian descent
English women in business
History of cosmetics
People from Littlehampton
Street newspaper people
British women company founders
20th-century English businesspeople